Penstemon newberryi is a species of penstemon known by the common name mountain pride or Newberry's penstemon. It is native to the mountains of northern California, Oregon, and Nevada, where it grows in rocky habitat, often at high elevation, such as talus. It is a bushy, mat-forming subshrub growing up to 30 centimeters tall. The leaves are mostly basal on the plant, oblong or oval and toothed, measuring 1 to 4 centimeters in length, with a few smaller pairs along the stem. The glandular inflorescence bears showy magenta flowers 2 to over 3 centimeters in length. The flower is generally tubular or funnel-shaped and has a coating of short to long and curly hairs in the mouth and on the staminode.

Penstemon newberryi is included in Penstemon subgenus Dasanthera, along with P. barrettiae, P. cardwellii, P. davidsonii, P. ellipticus, P. fruticosus, P. lyallii, P. montanus, and P. rupicola.

In cultivation in the UK it has received the Royal Horticultural Society's Award of Garden Merit. It tolerates a wide range of positions, but requires full sun.

This was John Muir's favorite flower.

The Latin specific epithet newberryi honors the American geologist and botanist John Strong Newberry (1822-1892).

References

External links

Jepson Manual Treatment
Photo gallery

newberryi
Flora of California
Flora of Nevada
Flora of Oregon
Flora without expected TNC conservation status